David Šmahaj (born 4 November 1981) is a Czech football midfielder. He previously played for Ružomberok.

External links

References

1981 births
Place of birth missing (living people)
Living people
Czech footballers
Czech expatriate footballers
Association football midfielders
FC Fastav Zlín players
MFK Vítkovice players
1. FC Slovácko players
MFK Ružomberok players
1. SC Znojmo players
Czech First League players
Czech National Football League players
Slovak Super Liga players
Expatriate footballers in Slovakia
Czech expatriate sportspeople in Slovakia
Expatriate footballers in Austria
Czech expatriate sportspeople in Austria